Preben Georg Rudiengaard (28 April 1944 – 14 October 2022) was a Danish politician. A member of the Venstre party, he served in the Folketing from 1998 to 2011.

Rudiengaard died in Ribe on 14 October 2022, at the age of 78.

References

1944 births
2022 deaths
Danish politicians
Danish physicians
Members of the Folketing
Venstre (Denmark) politicians
University of Copenhagen alumni
Knights of the Order of the Dannebrog
People from Copenhagen